McGifford is a surname. Notable people with the surname include:

Diane McGifford (born 1945), Canadian politician
Grahame McGifford (born 1955), English footballer